Khanewal  is a city and the capital of Khanewal District in the Punjab province of Pakistan. It is the 36th largest city of Pakistan by population.
Khanewal is named after the earliest settlers here who belonged to the caste ‘Daha’ (A Sub-Caste of  Panwar Rajput) and used ‘Khan’ in their names. That is how the city came to be known as ‘khan-e-wal’.

The district contains four tehsils which are as following:

 Khanewal Tehsil
 Mian Channu Tehsil
 Kabirwala Tehsil
 Jahanian Tehsil

Khanewal was made separate district in 1985, previously it was a tehsil of Multan district. Khanewal area was populated by Zayadat Khan, the forefather of the Daha family. It is said that he was originally from Dharwar but then migrated to Bahawalpur. After trying his luck in Bahawalpur, he moved to Pak Pattan. Then in the 1820s, he moved to this region after getting employment under Dewan Sawan Mall. As an employee, he was made responsible for collection and payments from Talamba, Kamalia and Laden. He got famous in the region as Khan and thus this area was named Khanewala. This theory is also supported by an old book named Raesa e Punjab Page. As per that document, the first person to populate this region was Sangar Khan.

Sangar Khan was the 34th descendant of Tikkey Khan, the first Muslim in the Daha family. Sangar Khan is said to have moved to Khanewal (Khanewal Pakistan) from Pak Pattan. It is said that he built a castle in the area. The family lived here for a long time and Hasan Khan, 37th descendant of Tikkey Khan, became one of the most prominent businessmen in the region. Hasan Khan was awarded Sanad from Pathan Governments in 1768. According to this book, Khanewal was first populated in 1050 AD.

Mughal Era 
The earliest settlers of the khanewal were Daha and Khatters who use Khan in their names. Under the Mughal Era, the region of Khanewal was flourished and was notable for trade and commerce. After Mughal's decline, the Sikh Empire occupied the region, and Muslims faced many Sikh rule restrictions.

British Era 
British rulers ruled the area till Pakistan's independence due to the junction of Khanewal-Wazirabad railway junction and considered British rulers’ well-planned town. khanewal contained a population of Hindus and Sikhs who migrated to India after partition. The people became Muslims dominantly due to missionary Sufi Saints.

It was declared a district in 1985 by taking two tehsils from District Multan, Kabirwala and Mian Channu. The city is the capital of District Khanewal.

Early Development in Khanewal 
In 1843, the British government in India decided to build railway tracks all over the country. An experimental train track was built from Bombay to Calcutta in 1843 which ended up being a huge success. In 1858 they approved a rail track connecting Multan-Lahore-Amritsar. Workers from all the villages rushed to get hired. After seven years of continuous work, the rail track finally opened on April 24, 1865. There were train stop stations all along the track connecting several cities and villages.

Khanewal was called Khanewalah at that time. The train track from Lahore to Multan was slightly arched upwards from Khanewal to Multan. Since most of the track was in a straight line and those were the early days of the train system, the railway department decided to build up a flag station at Khanewal, Punjab. Flag stations are smaller stations along a railway line where the train only stops if someone waves a flag.

Railway tracks were fascinating for locals all over India. People used to gather around the train tracks to see the train moving. With a flag station in Khanewal, people from all the surrounding villages started visiting khanewal just to see the train stop there for some time. That is when someone realized the opportunity and built the first inn (Dhaba) in Khanewal called the Railway Inn. It was built in 1860 and gradually became a prominent gathering point for people from the surrounding villages.

The railway's department initially allowed the locals to work on flag stations but this led to operational challenges. Therefore, they decided to hire trained staff from the United Kingdom and post them all over India to operate the railway network. Small quarters for British staff were built in Khanewalah in 1861. These British employees built the first graveyard in khanewal in 1865 which is still at its place and it is called Gora Qabarstan of Kohna Khanewal.

Subsequent Development in Khanewal 
Subsequently, the British government decided to link Karachi to these major cities of Punjab. Multan railway station represented the lowest end of the northern railway system while Lodhran station was the highest station on the map for the southern railway line. However, later on, it was realized that the distance from Khanewal flag station to Lodhran (90 km) is shorter than Multan to Lodhran station (135 km). Therefore, keeping cost constraints and timeline in mind, it was decided to install a chord line from Khanewal to Lodhran as well.

Therefore, in 1874, more staff from the railway department was sent to stay in Khanewal and oversee the construction of the Khanewal Lodhran Chord line. In order to support the staff stationed in Khanewal, the railway department pushed the government to improve the area. As a consequence, the government opened two schools in Khanewal. First, Government Primary School # 6 was opened in early 1876 in Kohna Khanewal and then MC Primary School # 7B was opened. Since Khanewal would become a junction where the railway line from Lahore splits in two ways, Multan and Lodhran, the railway department decided to build a small station here in 1876. In order to support the communications, a post and telegraph office was also built (current PTCL office) during the same year.

Work slowly continued and after 9 years in 1885, the Khanewal Lodhran Chord line became operational. Khanewal station became more important after getting the status of a junction. Moreover, the railway department needed more competent staff stationed here to make sure junction operations are properly managed. With the increase in economic activity, people from Kabirwala gradually started coming to Khanewal (still called Khanewalah among locals) for work. In 1886, a new separate post office was built in Khanewal Punjab.

After the success of the Khanewal Lodhran chord line in 1885, the railway department started working on the next phase to connect Layllpur (now called Faisalabad) with Khanewal. Work on another railway track from Khanewal to Layllpur was initiated in 1890 and on 4 April 1900, Khanewal-Toba Tek Singh was opened. This made Khanewal the biggest junction of India at that time. By this time the railway station of Khanewal was converted from a small flag station to a bigger developed station. It was one of the biggest stations in Northern India and was regarded highly with stations like Lahore, Multan and the Karachi Railway Station.

However, despite being a bigger railway station, the economic activity in the city was low. The city looked more like a desert with sand everywhere around it. The population of this region was only driven by the railway employees who lived on the Kohna Khanewal side of the railway track. Other than that, there was no agriculture or any economic activity in the area. There were no blocks, no civil lines, and no Gharibabad. All of it was sand dunes and it was still considered a small village that was a part of Kabirwala Tehsil. The people living in Kabirwala were still considered to have a higher social status than Khanewal.

Historical Event Timeline of Khanewal from 1712 to 1947

Geography
Historically The land where Khanewal is currently situated was barren originally and was called Gunji Bar or Kabirwala Bar. Bar is a geographical term used to describe elevated land on the sides of rivers. Initially, this area used to be the Southern shore of the river Ravi. At that time Ravi used to flow from East to West of Multan city. With the passage of time, the river kept changing its flow, the river soil turned this piece of land into vegetated land.

Climate

Demography
The population of Khanewal district was 2,068,000 in the 1998 Census. In the 2005 Economic Survey the population was reported at 2,376,000 with a growth rate of 2.4%. In 2015 the population of Khanewal khanewal was estimated to be 2,941,000.

According to the census of 1998, Punjabi is the most widely spoken first language of the khanewal, accounting for % of the population. Urdu was the native language of 7.8%, Saraiki – of 5.8% and Pashto – of 1.1%.

Urdu is the language spoken and understood by all. The main tribes and clans include: Niazi Afghans, Seoul, Daduana, Kamboh, Matyana, Gujjar, Doltana, Sahu, Rajputs (Rana), Rajpoot Dhudhi, Awan, Sheikh, Jatt, Bucha, Nikyana Sial, Siyal, Arain, Bhati, Baloch, Khokhars Mayo Solgi (jutt) and toru.

Education in Khanewal
The education system in Khanewal is formulated along specific modern, religious, cultural, social, psychological, commerce and scientific injunctions. The current literacy rate of khanewal is 39.9%. The standard national system of education is mainly inspired from the British system. The system also aims to imbibe a secular outlook among the students with the awareness of the rich cultural heritage of Pakistan. Khanewal has a wide range of schools, colleges and universities that caters to diverse streams.

The system is divided into five levels: primary (grades one through five); middle (grades six through eight); high (grades nine and ten, leading to the Secondary School Certificate); intermediate (grades eleven and twelve, leading to a Higher Secondary School Certificate); and university programs leading to graduate and advanced degrees.

Khanewal, like majority of the cities in Pakistan has both public and private educational institutions from primary to university level. Most educational institutions are gender based from primary to university level.

All academic education institutions are the responsibility of the provincial governments. The federal government mostly assists in curriculum development, accreditation and some financing of research.

Universities in Khanewal 

 University College of Management and Sciences (UCMS) - Khanewal
 Virtual University of Pakistan

Notable people

Iftikhar Anjum, Pakistani cricketer
Muhammad Khan Daha, (Member National Assembly of Pakistan)
Nishat Khan Daha, (Member Punjab Provincial Assembly)
Syed Fakhar Imam, Ex. Speaker National Assembly of Pakistan
Arshad Nadeem, Olympic athlete (Javelin throw)

See also 
 Khanewal District
 Khanewal Tehsil
 Khanewal Junction railway station

References

Populated places in Khanewal District
Cities in Punjab (Pakistan)
Khanewal District